Cardiff, Wales: 6/23/04 is an "official" bootleg live album by the Red Hot Chili Peppers, released in 2015. It was recorded on June 23, 2004 in Cardiff, Wales at Millennium Stadium during the band's Roll on the Red Tour. The show is notable for featuring the only officially released version of "Mini-Epic (Kill for Your Country)". The album consists of a soundboard recording of the full show from that date, and an MP3 version is available as a free download through the band's website. A lossless (FLAC) version of the album is also available for purchase.

Background 
Drummer Chad Smith on the show: "Cardiff Stadium was a warm up for the 3 Hyde Park shows. James Brown opened. And I think it may be the only time we played Mini Epic live."

The "3 Hyde Park shows" Smith referred to (June 19, 20, and 25, 2004) are represented on the band's first live album, Red Hot Chili Peppers Live in Hyde Park which contains a selection of songs from all three shows. Unlike that album, Cardiff, Wales: 6/23/04 consists of all the songs from a single concert on June 23, 2004. The song selection on the album effectively ignores the group's first four studio albums, in addition to their sixth, and includes tracks only from the band's fifth (Blood Sugar Sex Magik), seventh, and eighth studio albums.

The show features a live version of the unreleased song, "Mini-Epic (Kill for Your Country)". The band went into the studio to record additional tracks for the band's 2003 Greatest Hits album and a studio version was said to have been intended for inclusion on an anti-war compilation album that producer Rick Rubin was putting together, which ultimately never materialized. The song was only played five times during the Roll on the Red Tour.

Track listing

Personnel
Flea - bass, backing vocals, trumpet
John Frusciante - guitar, backing vocals, lead vocals on  "I Feel Love"
Anthony Kiedis - lead vocals
Chad Smith - drums

References

Red Hot Chili Peppers live albums
2015 live albums